Dhemsa is a traditional folk dance of tribal people of central India-Southern Odisha and adjacent areas of Chhattisgarh and Andhra Pradesh. The dancers form a chain by holding each others by the shoulder and waist and dancing to the tune of traditional instruments. Dhemsa is a unique folk-dance form performed in groups. It has a certain composition, style, rhythm, body language, traditional costumes, hairstyles, foot steps, etc.

Description
Its dusk down, the setting sun is painting the sky red and amber. Soon it will be dark. The earthen lamps are lit, and the flames have started dancing to the breeze that is enchanting our souls. The sweet yet powerful aroma of the evening forest is drenching our senses. The drums begin to roll, the rhythm sets in the Dhemsa begins. Traditional folk instruments that are used in this dance are dhol, tamak', changu and mahuri. Dhol is the bass drum, Tamak' is an instrument just like a bongo which maintains the tempo of the rhythm. Mohuri is a traditional musical instrument like Joruna. This dance is generally performed in late night by the tribes called "Desia" or "Adivasis" in all ceremonies including the annual ceremony "Chait Parab" and "Pus Puni" or "Pus Parab".
The person playing Mohuri is called "Mohuria" who plays the tune, and the drummers follow him.

Significance

This unique folk dance from Orissa is not just about the body movements but it combines unique hairstyles, traditional costumes, group compositions, stepping patterns etc. It is played with a typical folk music in the background. It is simple dance form which is a reflection of simplicity of lives of tribes of Odisha. Dhemsa is not just restricted to special occasions and festivals, but it is a part of the daily routine of tribal peoples. According to the local tribal people, it helps them to relax physically at the end of a hard working and also serves as the main source of entertainment. Since it is a group dance, it also helps the people in the tribal community to come together and promote a feeling of brotherhood and harmony. Dhemsa is an integral part of their lives which is performed on the birth of a child to as part of the celebration. On the other hand, it is also used during the loss of a family member to help the family to cope up with the sorrow. It has a special significance during marriages as it is believed to bind bride and groom together into a strong bond. It is a part of every tradition that is followed by tribes of Orissa.

Dhemsa dance has a rich artistry and deep community connection. This dance form is the portrait of great philosopher “Gondi Punem Muthava Pahandi Pari Kupar Lingo”. The dancers form a chain by clutching hands with each other or embracing with other dancers at their shoulders and waists. It is performed bare foot on the soil making a connection with mother earth and paying obeisance to her.

Dhemsa is every persons dance you don’t have to be expert to do a Rela the steps are simple but once you begin dancing you are mesmerized by it. It is performed during occasions like marriage ceremonies and is performed uninterruptedly over the entire night. This form of the dance is predominantly performed by the Gond & Pardhan tribe in various parts of eastern Vidarbha region of Maharashtra & Central parts of India.

Origin

There is no evidence available about the origin of this form of dance style. Instead, it has been carried from one generation to another by the tribes of Koraput district and has gradually spread to other districts like Bhotras, Bhumias, Kandhs, and Gadabas. 

This dance form is widely spread in Maharashtra state in Eastern part of Vidarbha region. Recently Kosodum Welfare Private Limited, has organized Dhemsa & Rela event in Mumbai region to promote the ancient dance form in the metro region. Tribal artists from Gadchiroli district will be performing this event.

References 

Folk dances of Odisha